The Dörbet (Züün Dörvöd/Eastern Dorbet) clan is composed of descendants of Ainaga (爱纳嘎), the 16th grandson of Hasar. It is a subtribe of the Khorchin Mongols, along with the Gorlos.The name probably means "döröv"; "four" (Middle Mongolian: Dörbe) or "dürveh; to flee" (Middle Mongolian: dürbehu).

See also 
 Heilongjiang
 Daqing
 Dorbod Mongol Autonomous County

Borjigin
Southern Mongols